Sir Walter Rangeley Maitland Lamb KCVO (5 January 1882 – 27 March 1961) was a British classical lecturer, author and translator. He was Secretary of the Royal Academy from 1913 to 1951.

He was born in Adelaide, Australia.
He was appointed a Commander of the Royal Victorian Order (CVO), and on 1 January 1943, a Knight Commander of the Order (KCVO).

Publications
The Royal Academy : a short history of its foundation and development by Sir Walter R.M. Lamb (1951)

References

External links
 

1882 births
1961 deaths
20th-century translators
Australian art historians
Australian expatriates in the United Kingdom
Australian Knights Commander of the Royal Victorian Order
Australian translators
Alumni of the Royal Academy Schools